is a subway station on the Toei Mita Line in Itabashi, Tokyo, Japan, operated by the Tokyo subway operator Tokyo Metropolitan Bureau of Transportation (Toei). It is the northernmost station on the Tokyo subway network.

Lines
Nishi-takashimadaira Station is served by the Toei Mita Line, and is numbered "I-27".

Layout
The station consists of two side platforms both heading the same direction. This is one of the few dead-end terminal stations on the Tokyo subway network that have side platforms (the others being Nishi-Magome on the Asakusa Line and Kita-Ayase on the Chiyoda Line). The platforms are located on the second floor ("2F") level.

Platforms

History
The station opened on 5 June 1976.

Passenger statistics
In fiscal 2011, the station was used by an average of 12,048 passengers daily.

See also
List of railway stations in Japan

References

External links

Toei station information 

Railway stations in Tokyo
Railway stations in Japan opened in 1976
Railway stations in Japan opened in 1997
Toei Mita Line